Charles Stuart (22 October 16605 May 1661) was the first of four sons and eight children born from the marriage between the Duke of York (later King James II of England & VII of Scotland) and his first wife, Anne Hyde. He was styled Duke of Cambridge, but never formally created so, because he died so young.

Charles was conceived seven months before his parents' official marriage and if royal advisors and Queen Henrietta Maria, the mother of James, had their way, he could have been declared illegitimate. King Charles II, James's older brother, approved of the marriage and the wedding between James and Anne was held on 3 September 1660 in London. Charles was born on 22 October and was baptised on 1 January 1661 at Worcester House. However, he died before reaching the age of one, after becoming ill with smallpox. He was buried in Westminster Abbey on 6 May 1661. Three of his younger brothers, likewise short-lived, were also called Duke of Cambridge: James, Edgar, and Charles.

Arms

During his short life, Charles bore a coat of arms, as a grandson of a British sovereign, consisting those of the kingdom, differenced by a label argent of five points ermine.

References

Bibliography
 

|-

1660 births
1661 deaths
17th-century English nobility
People from London
Dukes of Cambridge
Courtesy dukes
Princes of England
Princes of Scotland
House of Stuart
Children of James II of England
Burials at Westminster Abbey
Royalty and nobility who died as children
Sons of kings
Heirs apparent who never acceded